Francisco Villagutiérrez Chumacero (1587–1652) was a Roman Catholic prelate who served as Auxiliary Bishop of Toledo (1646–1652).

Biography
Francisco Villagutiérrez Chumacero was born in Valladolid, Spain in 1587 and ordained a priest in the Order of Saint Augustine. On 19 Feb 1646, he was appointed during the papacy of Pope Innocent X as Auxiliary Bishop of Toledo and Titular Bishop of Troas. He served as Auxiliary Bishop of Toledo until his death in 1652.

References 

17th-century Roman Catholic bishops in Spain
1587 births
1652 deaths
Bishops appointed by Pope Innocent X
Augustinian bishops